Raab-Katzenstein RK-26 Tigerschwalbe, also known as the Fieseler F 1 Tigerschwalbe, was a German twin-seat biplane trainer aircraft designed by Gerhard Fieseler by the end of the 1920s.

Design and development
In December 1930, Fieseler was invited by the Swedish Air Force (Flygvapnet) to present his aircraft for the Swedish aircraft manufacturing company ASJA. Flygvapnet was in need for a new trainer, and the RK-26 was an interesting aircraft. Fieseler had recently won a world aerobatics championship with an RK-26. ASJA then decided to buy one aircraft. It was tested with different engine configurations by Flygvapnet, who later ordered 25 aircraft from ASJA.

Operational history
The trainer was given the designation Sk 10 by Flygvapnet. It was used between 1932 and 1945, but was quite controversial during its active life. This was partly due to changes in the design, which made the aircraft 200 kg heavier than the original, and this changed its flight characteristics drastically. The aircraft was involved in many accidents. Of the 25 delivered aircraft, 18 were written off.

One aircraft, the SE-ADK was purchased in 1934 by a civilian, L. Hemmeringer. When the Winter War began, Hemmeninger donated the aircraft to Finland. The aircraft ended up being used by the Swedish Voluntary Air Force from 9 February 1940. The aircraft was painted in Finnish colors, but was used quite sparingly, due to lack of spares and the bad condition of its engine. Most of the time it was standing at the air force base in Veitsiluoto.

Surviving craft
One Sk 10, the only remaining Tigerschwalbe, is preserved at the Flygvapenmuseum.

Operators

Austrian Air Force

Finnish Air Force

Swedish Air Force

Specifications

See also

References

Raab-Katzenstein aircraft
Biplanes
Aerobatic aircraft
Single-engined tractor aircraft
1920s German military trainer aircraft
Aircraft first flown in 1929